Carroll Gibson (born May 26, 1945) is an American politician. He was a member of the Kentucky State Senate from the 5th District, serving from 2004 to 2017. He is a member of the Republican Party.

References

Living people
1945 births
Republican Party Kentucky state senators
Place of birth missing (living people)
21st-century American politicians